The fourth season of Nouvelle Star began on February 22, 2006. All the judges returned to the panel and Benjamin Castaldi was set to host for a fourth time. However after the season went halfway through he was replaced by Virginie Efira on May 24. 
Auditions were held in the following cities:
 Rennes (18 October 2005)
 Marseilles (31 October 2005)
 Lille (6 November 2005)
 Toulouse (14 November 2005)
 Liège (21 November 2005)
 Lyon (5 December 2005)
 Paris (17 December 2005)
Due to problems with the voting lines the results from the original top 14, in which the 10 finalists were supposed to be determined, were voided and the four original eliminated contestants received a second chance in the following week which resulted in all of them making the cut while four original top 10 contestants were eliminated in the semifinals. 
In the end Christophe Willem who was never in the Bottom group triumphed over Dominique Michalon who was in the Bottom group before the finals.

Contestants

Elimination chart

Live show details

Pre Live Show 1 (30 March 2006)

Notes
The results from the original top 14 were voided due to problems with voting lines. Gaël Faure, Joana Boumendil, Stéphanie Lipstadt, Valérie Castan received a second chance in the following week.

Pre Live Show 2 (5 April 2006)

Live Show 1 (13 April 2006)
Theme:

Live Show 2 (19 April 2006)
Theme:

Live Show 3 (28 April 2006)
Theme:

Live Show 4 (4 May 2006)
Theme:

Live Show 5 (12 May 2006)
Theme:

Live Show 6 (18 May 2006)
Theme:

Live Show 7 (25 May 2006)
Theme:

Live Show 8: Semi-final (31 May 2006)
Theme:

Live final (8 June 2006)

References

External links 
 Official site

Season 04
2006 French television seasons